Kaidu (Middle Mongol:  , Modern Mongol:  / , ; ; c. 1230 – 1301) was a grandson of the Mongol khagan Ögedei (1185–1241) and thus leader of the House of Ögedei and the de facto khan of the Chagatai Khanate, a division of the Mongol Empire. He ruled parts of modern-day Xinjiang and Central Asia during the 13th century, and actively opposed his uncle, Kublai, who established the Yuan dynasty. Medieval chroniclers often mistranslated Kadan as Kaidu, mistakenly placing Kaidu at the Battle of Legnica. Kadan was the brother of Güyük, and Kaidu's uncle.

Early life
Kaidu was the son of Kashin (whose name is also spelled Qashi) and therefore a grandson of Ögedei Khan and Töregene Khatun, and a great-grandson of Genghis Khan and Börte. His mother's name was Shabkana Khatun from the Bekrin (Mekrin) tribe of mountaineers that were "neither Mongols, nor Uighurs".

In 1260, Marco Polo described Yarkand, part of the area under Kaidu as "five days' journey in extent"; that its inhabitants were mostly Muslim although there were also some Nestorian and Jacobite Assyrians; and that it had plenty of food and other necessities, "especially cotton." In the Toluid Civil War between 1260 and 1264,  Kublai Khan was warring with his own brother Ariq Böke, who was proclaimed Great Khan at Karakorum, Kaidu began to have major conflicts with Kublai and his ally, the Ilkhanate. 

Meanwhile, the Chagatayid Khan Alghu, who supported Kublai as Khagan, ravaged the lands of Kaidu. This forced Kaidu to make an alliance with Berke, the khan of the Golden Horde.

Conquest of Transoxiana
After the defeat of Ariq Böke in 1264, Kublai summoned Kaidu to his court, possibly to discuss the future of the empire and give Kaidu his share of the Ögedeid appanage in China. But Kaidu avoided appearing at his court and said that his horses were too thin to bear long distance travel. Because Genghis Khan had made a law that all branches of the family had to approve the granting of the title of Great Khan, Kaidu's enmity was a constant obstacle to Kublai's ambitions.  

In 1266 Baraq was dispatched to Central Asia to take the throne of Chagatai. Kublai instigated Baraq to attack Kaidu in 1268. At first Baraq defeated Kaidu, however, the former was defeated by the latter with the assistance of Möngke-Temür, successor of Berke. When Baraq advanced towards Kaidu, the latter set a trap for the invader's troops on the bank of the Jaxartes, and defeated his forces. Transoxiana was then ravaged by Kaidu. Baraq fled to Samarkand, then Bukhara, plundering the cities along the way in an attempt to rebuild his army. These actions alarmed Kaidu, who did not want the region to be further devastated. Kaidu also needed to free up his army for a potential conflict with Kublai. Peace was therefore proposed, and Baraq was pressured by the governors of the sedentary areas of the khanate, Mas'ud Beg and Daifu, to accept. He did, and peace was declared, although sources conflict on the time and location. Rashid al-Din claims that the meeting took place in the spring of 1269 in Talas, while Wassaf writes that it took place around 1267 to the south of Samarkand. Either way, two-thirds of Transoxiana were granted to Baraq, while the other third went to Kaidu and Mengu-Timur. Kaidu also gained control of the region around Bukhara. Neither side gained control of the cities; the administration of these instead devolved to Mas'ud Beg, while Baraq and Kaidu agreed to reside only in the deserts and mountains.

Later defeats and death

Kaidu convinced Baraq to attack Persia under the Ilkhanids. Baraq suffered a large defeat at Herat on July 22, 1270  against Abagha. Baraq died en route to meet Kaidu who had been waiting for his weakness. The Chagatayid princes including Mubarak Shah submitted to Kaidu and proclaimed him as their overlord. Sons of Baraq rebelled against Kaidu but they were defeated. Many of the Chagatayid princes fled to the Ilkhanate. Kaidu's early attempt to rule the Chagatayids faced a serious resistance. The Mongol princes such as Negübei, whom he appointed khan of the House of Chagatai revolted several times. Stable control came when Duwa was made khan who became his number two in 1282.   

In 1275 Kaidu invaded Ürümqi and demanded its submission, but the Buddhist Idiqut resisted. Kublai sent a relief force to expel him. Kublai's son Nomukhan and generals occupied Almaliq from 1266–76, to prevent Kaidu's invasion. In 1277, a group of Genghisid princes under Möngke's son Shiregi rebelled, kidnapping Kublai's two sons and his general Antong. The rebels handed Antong to Kaidu and the princes to Möngke-Temür. The Great Khan's armies drove Shiregi's forces west of the Altai Mountains and strengthened the Yuan garrisons in Mongolia and Xinjiang. However, Kaidu took control over Almaliq.

Though Kaidu had fourteen sons, he relied mostly on his daughter Khutulun for advice and aid in military matters. 

Kaidu had waged almost continuous warfare for more than 30 years against Kublai and his successor Temür, though he eventually fell in 1301, when he was defeated and wounded during a battle near Karakorum and died shortly afterwards.

Cultural references
Kaidu is often portrayed in historical fiction or dramatic works.  He was an antagonist in The Journeyer, a novel by Gary Jennings published in 1984.  The character of Kaidu was portrayed by Rick Yune in the Netflix original series, Marco Polo (2015–2016).

Kaido is an antagonist in the series One Piece, "Kaido of the hundred beasts" which is said to be the strongest 'creature' in the One Piece world, Kaido resembles the Mongol warrior Kaidu, and he has a daughter named "Yamato" that is loosely inspired by the famous Khutulun.

See also
 Kaidu–Kublai war
 Division of the Mongol Empire

References
Sources

Further reading

External links
Hill, John E. The Western Regions according to the Hou Hanshu, Second Edition, 2003. (Based on 2004 edition, not yet online)

1235 births
1301 deaths
Chagatai khans
13th-century Mongol rulers
Ögedei Khan
Monarchs killed in action
Sons of emperors